Nethaneel - נתנאל "Gift of/is God", Standard Hebrew Nətanʾel, Tiberian Hebrew Nəṯanʾēl, also Nethanel:

 The son of Zuar, chief of the tribe of Issachar and one of the leaders of the tribes of Israel during the Exodus (Num. 1:8; 2:5, 7:18, 23; 10:15).
 One of David's brothers (1 Chr. 2:14).
 A priest who blew the trumpet before the ark when it was brought up to Jerusalem (1 Chr. 15:24).
 A Levite (1 Chr. 24:6).
 A temple porter, of the family of the Korhites (1 Chr. 26:4).
 One of the "princes" appointed by Jehoshaphat to teach the law through the cities of Judah (2 Chr. 17:7).
 A chief Levite in the time of Josiah (2 Chr. 35:9).
 A son of Passhur, one of the biblical priests who had taken a pagan wife but repented according to Ezra 10:22.
 Neh. 12:21.
 A priest's son who bore a trumpet at the dedication of the walls of Jerusalem (Neh. 12:36).

The Midrash lists Nethaneel as one of the several names of Moses.

See also

 Netanel Artzi (born 1997), Israeli basketball player

References

Book of Numbers people